Ferndale is an unincorporated community in Union Township, Parke County, in the U.S. state of Indiana.

History
A post office was established at Ferndale in 1884, and remained in operation until it was discontinued in 1904. The community was so named on account of the  ferns near the original town site.

Geography

References

Unincorporated communities in Indiana
Unincorporated communities in Parke County, Indiana